Paladyn, Journal of Behavioral Robotics, is a peer-reviewed open-access scientific journal covering topics broadly related to neuronally and psychologically inspired robots and other behaving autonomous systems. It was established in 2010 and is published by Walter de Gruyter. The editor-in-chief is Gregor Schöner (Ruhr University Bochum).

Abstracting and indexing
The journal is abstracted and indexed in:

EBSCO databases
Inspec
ProQuest databases
Scopus

References

External links

Robotics journals
Publications established in 2010
English-language journals
De Gruyter academic journals
Continuous journals
Creative Commons Attribution-licensed journals